Direct lending is a form of corporate debt provision in which lenders other than banks make loans to companies without intermediaries such as an investment bank, a broker or a private equity firm. In direct lending, the borrowers are usually smaller or mid-sized companies, also called small and medium enterprises, rather than large, listed companies, and the lenders may be wealthy individuals or asset management firms.

Peer-to-peer lending networks such as crowdfunding are sometimes considered part of the direct lending market and lend to very small companies. However, most asset managers involved in direct lending will consider loans only above a certain size, typically €5 million or more. Aside from peer-to-peer networks, direct lending is therefore mainly focused on middle market borrowers. 

The market has grown in importance since around 2009 in response to banks reducing their lending activities to companies in the wake of the Financial crisis of 2007-08. There is little comprehensive data on the size of the market and the scale of the opportunity is disputed. The need for direct lending has been put at €100 billion in Europe alone between 2013 and 2015. However, other sources report that in 2014 asset managers are struggling to find enough direct lending opportunities to invest in.

Asset managers cite the higher returns available from direct lending strategies as a main reason that people should invest in direct lending. US pension funds are among the investors who are reported to have made allocations to direct lending strategies, especially in Europe.
Several European governments have taken initiatives to boost direct lending to smaller companies since the financial crisis. For example, in 2012, the UK government introduced a scheme to lend £700 million of public money to smaller companies in partnership with asset managers.
A large number of asset management firms have started funds to invest in direct lending, and several US firms have targeted European direct lending since around the start of 2013.

See also
Crowdfunding
Venture capital
Angel investor
Revenue-based financing
History of private equity and venture capital

References

External links 
Direct Lending Funds – Are the Needs of Mid-Market Companies Being Met?

Financial services
Credit